Engines of Creation is the eighth studio album by guitarist Joe Satriani, released on March 14, 2000 through Epic Records. The album reached No. 90 on the U.S. Billboard 200 and remained on that chart for three weeks, as well as reaching the top 100 in three other countries. "Until We Say Goodbye" was released as a single and received a nomination for Best Rock Instrumental Performance at the 2001 Grammy Awards, Satriani's tenth such nomination.

Release and tour
Mixing for Engines of Creation took place in June–July 1999 and the title was revealed on December 13. A limited edition EP, Additional Creations, was released free of charge alongside the album in some stores. Worldwide touring began in the U.S in April–May 2000, followed by Europe in June–July, Central and South America in August, and concluding in the U.S. in December.

Style and composition
In a unique and notable departure from Satriani's usual style, Engines of Creation mainly features experimentation with electronic and techno music rather than the straightforward instrumental rock heard on his previous albums; Satriani has described the album as "completely techno." With the exception of "Until We Say Goodbye", all tracks were made using guitars recorded and mixed non-traditionally on computer platforms, as well as being digitally manipulated using synthesizers and computer software.

Critical reception

Steve Huey at AllMusic gave Engines of Creation three stars out of five, calling it "the biggest stylistic shift [Satriani has] made yet" and "a brave and sporadically successful experiment". He suggested that longtime fans of Satriani's regular material may be disappointed, as well as those who dislike electronic sounds in guitar-based music, but praised Satriani for challenging himself to "find ways of coaxing totally new sounds from his guitar", and that "his melodies and main themes have rarely been this angular and off-kilter, meaning that exploring this music has indeed helped Satriani refresh and re-imagine his signature sound."

Track listing

Personnel
Joe Satriani – guitar, keyboard, programming, arrangement, production
Eric Caudieux – keyboard, programming, bass, arrangement, editing, engineering, mixing, production
Anton Fig – drums
Pat Thrall – bass
Enrique Gonzalez – engineering assistance
Mike Pilar – engineering assistance
Mike Fraser – mixing
Howie Weinberg – mastering
Kevin Shirley – production

Chart performance

Certifications

Awards

References

External links
In Review: Joe Satriani "Engines Of Creation" at Guitar Nine Records

Joe Satriani albums
2000 albums
Epic Records albums
Albums produced by Kevin Shirley
Grammy Award for Best Rock Instrumental Performance